Embassy of Ukraine in Podgorica is the diplomatic mission of Ukraine in Podgorica, Montenegro. Since October 2017 Chargé d'affaires of Ukraine in Podgorica is Nataliia Fiialka.

History of the diplomatic relations
Ukraine recognized the independence of Montenegro on June 15, 2006. Diplomatic relations between two countries were established on August 22, 2006, by exchange of diplomatic notes. The embassy of Ukraine in Montenegro was opened in 2008.

See also
 Montenegro–Ukraine relations
 List of diplomatic missions in Montenegro
 Foreign relations of Montenegro
 Foreign relations of Ukraine

External links

References

Montenegro–Ukraine relations
Podgorica
Buildings and structures in Podgorica